The Parish Church of the Annunciation is a Roman Catholic parish church located in the village of Balzan, Malta.

History
The original church of the Annunciation dated back to the 14th century.  On 14 August 1655 Balzan became an independent parish and the church was chosen as the parish church. On December 23, 1669 the cornerstone of the new church was laid. The church was built in the form of a Latin cross. Works were completed by 1695 and the church was blessed that year on January 23 by Bishop Davide Cocco Palmieri and consecrated by Bishop Vincenzo Labini on October 7, 1781. A belfry was also added in 1708 which today includes 6 bells made in Annecy, France, by Fonderie Paccard.  The largest bell of this set weighs about 4 tons and is the third largest bell in Malta.  The bell was blessed and installed in January 1949. An electric clock was added in 1970.

See also
Catholic Church in Malta

References

Balzan
Limestone churches in Malta
17th-century Roman Catholic church buildings in Malta
National Inventory of the Cultural Property of the Maltese Islands
Roman Catholic churches completed in 1695